Megan Larsen is a natural and organic skin care entrepreneur and author.  She is the founder of Sodashi, a natural skin care range, supplying more than 70 luxury spas in more than 25 countries.

Early life 
Larsen was born in Dannevirke, New Zealand in 1962 and grew up in Napier.  She moved to Western Australia in her early 30s, and now resides in Sydney.

Career 
Larsen started her career working in a pharmacy, and then went on to study beauty therapy and natural healthcare. She completed an advanced diploma in aromatherapy in Provence. She also has a background in Ayurveda and Transcendental Meditation. Larsen started making her products in the early 1990s and founded Sodashi in 1999.

In 2016, Larsen was awarded the InStyle Award for Beauty.

In October 2018, Larsen published her first book Startups & Self-Care.

References

External links 

1962 births
Living people
People from Dannevirke
New Zealand emigrants to Australia
Australian business executives
Australian women company founders
Australian company founders